Tribeni Union is a union parishad of Shailkupa Upazila, Jhenaidah District, Khulna Division, Bangladesh. There are 20 villages and 8 Mouzas in the union.

References

External links
 

Unions of Khulna Division
Unions of Shailkupa Upazila
Unions of Jhenaidah District